Joachim Ritu Cabi Crima or Vassily Ivanovich Crima, a Guinea-Bissauan-born farmer living in Russia. He is a former independent candidate in the 2009 Srednyaya Akhtuba election. As the first black man to run for head of the district, Crima received the nickname "the Russian Obama". However, both he and another black candidate for the post, Filipp Kondratyev came in third (with 4.75%) and last against the United Russia incumbent.

Joaquim Crima settled in southern Russia in 1989 after earning a degree from Volgograd State Pedagogical University. He and his wife, Anait, who is of Armenian descent, have a 10-year-old son. In addition to farming, he also sells melons at the local marketplace in the district.

References 

Living people
Russian politicians
Russian people of Bissau-Guinean descent
Bissau-Guinean emigrants to the Soviet Union
People from Volgograd Oblast
Year of birth missing (living people)